The Treason Act 1535 (27 Hen.8 c. 2) was an Act passed by the English Parliament during the reign of King Henry VIII of England in 1535.

It made it high treason to counterfeit the Privy Seal, Signet or royal sign-manual.

The Act was repealed by the Treason Act 1553, but another Act passed later in the same year recreated the offence.

See also
High treason in the United Kingdom

References

Treason in England
Acts of the Parliament of England (1485–1603)
1535 in law
1535 in England